Joseph Brown (1823December 3, 1899) was mayor of Alton, Illinois, serving from 1856 to 1857, and the 21st mayor of St. Louis, Missouri, serving from 1871 to 1875.

Childhood and young adulthood 
Brown was born in 1823 in Jedburgh, Scotland. He lived there with his family until he turned eight.  Afterwards, he and his family immigrated to the United States, settling down in Alton, Illinois. Brown received a good education, partially completing his college career before going to work in the milling business at the age 18.

After a few years, Brown met Miss Virginia Keach. In 1854, they got married, and later had two daughters.

Brown was also well known in the river traffic. He oversaw many of his steamers' construction.  At the start of the American Civil War, Brown retired from this business to pursue real estate operations. However, he continued on assisting in the construction in many of the gunboats and ironclad ships for the Navy.

Political career 
Before becoming elected to being the St. Louis Mayor, Brown served as the head of the City government and Mayor of Alton, IL.  During this time period, Brown successfully connected Chicago and Alton with a railroad. As a war democrat, he additionally was elected to the Missouri State Senate.

in 1871, Brown was elected to be the Mayor of St. Louis. Within his second year after being elected, Brown helped oversee the creation of a temporary City Hall (where the present Civil Courts Building is) and the taxpayers' League. This league's purpose was to "aid in securing honesty, economy and efficiency in the administration of municipal affairs and public affairs." In 1873, the city faced a critical depression.  In order to help alleviate the citizens, Brown ran a soup kitchen for as many as 1200 people per day and issued tax certificates of $300,000, which was also known as "Brown Bucks".  To support them, Brown used his own credit as well as the city's. The following year, Brown passed legislature that created Forest Park, O'Fallon park, and Carondlet Park and helped administer the completion of the Eads Bridge.

Later life and death 

On December 3, 1899, Brown died. He was buried in Grandview Cemetery in Alton, Illinois.

References

External links

 Joseph Brown at the St. Louis Public Library: St. Louis Mayors website

1823 births
1899 deaths
Mayors of St. Louis
19th-century American politicians